Alexandre Manuel Fortes Alhinho (born 7 December 1953) is a Cape Verdean retired footballer who played as a defender and was a manager of regional clubs and the national team between 2003 and 2006.

He was the brother of the Portuguese international player and manager Carlos Alhinho.

Biography
Alexandre Alhinho was born on the island of Sãp Vicente.  Shortly after he immigrated to Portugal where he played his youth years for a season with Académica de Coimbra, he played as a defender.  He started his pro career in 1973 with SC Farense for a season.  His second club was FC Porto in the following season who finished as second in the Portuguese Championships.

He returned to Académica Coimbra in the following season in 1975 and this time in the professional club and played 55 matches for two seasons. In 1977, he spent five seasons with Os Belenenses and played 98 matches.  He returned to Farense in 1982 where the club was playing in the Second Division.  The club finished first in the south group, then the club won the silver title with a club of the north group.  He played in the Premier Division and the club finished 2nd in the 1983/84 season, he scored the only goal of his career.  He played inside the Second Division and with Lusitano Évora for a season in 1984 and then GD Estoril, a club based in Praia in the Azores.  For the next three season, he would play for his last club based in northcentral Portugal, Académico de Viseu also in the Second Division, the club finished second behind FC Famalicão and again played inside the Premier Division and played 22 matches there.

He retired from playing football (soccer) and headed back to Cape Verde, no long after, he coached Académica do Mindelo where he helped win their only national title.  Later, he coached Batuque FC.  On 26 September 2012 he became coach of Académica do Mindelo once more.

Honours
Manager
 Cape Verdean Football Championship: 1989

References

1953 births
Living people
Cape Verdean footballers
Cape Verdean football managers
People from São Vicente, Cape Verde
Association football defenders
S.C. Farense players
FC Porto players
Associação Académica de Coimbra – O.A.F. players
C.F. Os Belenenses players
Lusitano G.C. players
G.D. Estoril Praia players
Académico de Viseu F.C. players
Primeira Liga players
Segunda Divisão players
Cape Verde national football team managers
Cape Verdean expatriate footballers
Expatriate footballers in Portugal
Cape Verdean expatriate sportspeople in Portugal